Food loss and waste is food that is not eaten. The causes of food waste or loss are numerous and occur throughout the food system, during production, processing, distribution, retail and food service sales, and consumption. Overall, about one-third of the world's food is thrown away. A 2021 metaanalysis that did not include food lost during production, by the United Nations Environment Programme found that food waste was a challenge in all countries at all levels of economic development. The analysis estimated that global food waste was 931 million tonnes of food waste (about 121 kg per capita) across three sectors: 61 per cent from households, 26 per cent from food service and 13 per cent from retail.

Food loss and waste is a major part of the impact of agriculture on climate change (it amounts to 3.3 billion tons of CO2e emissions annually) and other environmental issues, such as land use, water use and loss of biodiversity. Prevention of food waste is the highest priority, and when prevention is not possible, the food waste hierarchy ranks the food waste treatment options from preferred to least preferred based on their negative environmental impacts. Reuse pathways of surplus food intended for human consumption, such as food donation, is the next best strategy after prevention, followed by animal feed, recycling of nutrients and energy followed by the least preferred option, landfill, which is a major source of the greenhouse gas methane. Other considerations include unreclaimed phosphorus in food waste leading to further phosphate mining. Moreover, reducing food waste in all parts of the food system is an important part of reducing the environmental impact of agriculture, by reducing the total amount of water, land, and other resources used.

The UN's Sustainable Development Goal Target 12.3  seeks to "halve global per capita food waste at the retail and consumer levels and reduce food losses along production and supply chains, including post-harvest losses" by 2030. Climate change mitigation strategies prominently feature reducing food waste. In the 2022 United Nations Biodiversity Conference nations agree to reduce food waste by 50% by the year 2030.

Definition 

Food loss and waste occurs at all stages of the food supply chain – production, processing, sales, and consumption. Definitions of what constitutes food loss versus food waste or what parts of foods (i.e., inedible parts) exit the food supply chain are considered lost or wasted vary. Terms are often defined on a situational basis (as is the case more generally with definitions of waste). Professional bodies, including international organizations, state governments, and secretariats may use their own definitions.

United Nations
The Food and Agriculture Organization (FAO) of the United Nations defines food loss and waste as the decrease in quantity or quality of food along the food supply chain. Within this framework, UN Agencies distinguish loss and waste at two different stages in the process:

Food loss occurs along the food supply chain from harvest/slaughter/catch up to, but not including, the sales level
Food waste occurs at the retail and consumption level.

Important components of this definition include:

 Food redirected to nonfood chains (including animal feed, compost, or recovery to bioenergy) is not counted as food loss or waste. Inedible parts are not considered as food loss or waste (these inedible parts are sometimes referred to as unavoidable food waste)
Under Sustainable Development Goal 12, the Food and Agriculture Organization is responsible for measuring food loss, while the UN Environmental Program measures food waste.

European Union
In the European Union (EU), food waste is defined by combining the definitions of food and waste, namely: "any substance or product, whether processed, partially processed or unprocessed, intended to be, or reasonably expected to be ingested by humans (...)" (including things such as drinks and chewing gum; excluding things such as feed, medicine, cosmetics, tobacco products, and narcotic or psychotropic substances) "which the holder discards or intends or is required to discard".

Previously, food waste was defined by directive 75/442/EEC as "any food substance, raw or cooked, which is discarded, or intended or required to be discarded" in 1975. In 2006, 75/442/EEC was repealed by 2006/12/EC, which defined waste as "any substance or object in the categories set out in Annex I which the holder discards or intends or is required to discard". Meanwhile, Article 2 of Regulation (EC) No 178/2002 (the General Food Law Regulation), as amended on 1 July 2022, defined food as "any substance or product, whether processed, partially processed or unprocessed, intended to be, or reasonably expected to be ingested by humans (...)", including things such as drinks and chewing gum, excluding things such as feed, medicine, cosmetics, tobacco products, and narcotic or psychotropic substances.

A 2016 European Court of Auditors special report had criticised the lack of a common definition of food waste as hampering progress, and a May 2017 resolution by the European Parliament supported a legally binding definition of food waste. Finally, the 2018/851/EU directive of 30 May 2018 (the revised Waste Framework Directive) combined the two (after waste was redefined in 2008 by Article 3.1 of 2008/98/EC as "any substance or object which the holder discards or intends or is required to discard") by defining food waste as "all food as defined in Article 2 of Regulation (EC) No 178/2002 of the European Parliament and of the Council that has become waste."

United States

As of 2022, the United States Environmental Protection Agency (EPA) employed three categories:
 "Excess food refers to food that is recovered and donated to feed people."
 "Food waste refers to food such as plate waste (i.e., food that has been served but not eaten), spoiled food, or peels and rinds considered inedible that is sent to feed animals, to be composted or anaerobically digested, or to be landfilled or combusted with energy recovery."
 "Food loss refers to unused product from the agricultural sector, such as unharvested crops."

In 2006, the EPA defined food waste as "uneaten food and food preparation wastes from residences and commercial establishments such as grocery stores, restaurants, produce stands, institutional cafeterias and kitchens, and industrial sources like employee lunchrooms".

The states remain free to define food waste differently for their purposes, though as of 2009, many had not done so.

Other definitions 
Bellemare et al. (2017) compared four definitions from:
 a Food and Agriculture Organization (FAO) 2016 report: "Food loss is defined as ‘the decrease in quantity or quality of food.’ Food waste is part of food loss and refers to discarding or alternative (nonfood) use of food that is safe and nutritious for human consumption along the entire food supply chain, from primary production to end household consumer level";
 an Economic Research Service (ERS; a USDA agency) 2014 report: "Food loss represents the amount of food postharvest, that is available for human consumption but is not consumed for any reason. It includes cooking loss and natural shrinkage (for example, moisture loss); loss from mould, pests, or inadequate climate control; and food waste. Food waste is a component of food loss and occurs when an edible item goes unconsumed, as in food discarded by retailers due to color or appearance, and plate waste by consumers";
 a FUSIONS (an EU project) 2016 report: "Food waste is any food, and inedible parts of food, removed from the food supply chain to be recovered or disposed (including composed [sic], crops ploughed in/not harvested, anaerobic digestion, bioenergy production, co-generation, incineration, disposal to sewer, landfill or discarded to sea)"; and
 an EPA 2016 report: "The amount of food going to landfills from residences, commercial establishments (e.g., grocery stores and restaurants), institutional sources (e.g., school cafeterias), and industrial sources (e.g., factory lunchrooms). Pre-consumer food generated during the manufacturing and packaging of food products is not included in EPA's food waste estimates."

According to Bellemare et al., the inclusion of food that goes to nonfood productive use is flawed for two reasons: "First, if recovered food is used as an input, such as animal feed, fertilizer, or biomass to produce output, then by definition it is not wasted. However, there might be economic losses if the cost of recovered food is higher than the average cost of inputs in the alternative, nonfood use. Second, the definition creates practical problems for measuring food waste because the measurement requires tracking food loss in every stage of the supply chain and its proportion that flows to nonfood uses." They argued that only food that ends up in landfills should be counted as food waste, pointing to the 2016 EPA definition as a good example. Bellemare et al. also noted that "the FAO and ERS definitions only apply to edible and safe and nutritious food, whereas the definitions of FUSIONS and the EPA apply to both edible and inedible parts of food. Finally, the ERS and EPA definitions of food waste exclude the food that is not harvested at the farm level."

A 2019 FAO report stated:

Methodology 
The 2019 FAO report stated: "Food loss and waste has typically been measured in physical terms using tonnes as reporting units. This measurement fails to account for the economic value of different commodities and can risk attributing a higher weight to low-value products just because they are heavier. [This] report acknowledges this by adopting a measure that accounts for the economic value of produce." Hall et al. (2009) calculated food waste in the United States in terms of energy value "by comparing the US food supply data with the calculated food consumed by the US population." The result was that food waste among American consumers increased from "about 30% of the available food supply in 1974 to almost 40% in recent years" (the early 2000s), or about 900 kcal per person per day (1974) to about 1400 kcal per person per day (2003). A 2012 Natural Resources Defense Council report interpreted this to mean that Americans threw away up to 40% of food that was safe to eat. Buzby & Hyman (2012) estimated both the total weight (in kg and lbs) and monetary value (in USD) of food loss in the United States, concluding that 'the annual value of food loss is almost 10% of the average amount spent on food per consumer in 2008'.

Sources

Production
In the United States, food loss can occur at most stages of the food industry and in significant amounts. In subsistence agriculture, the amounts of food loss are unknown, but are likely to be insignificant by comparison, due to the limited stages at which loss can occur, and given that food is grown for projected need as opposed to a global marketplace demand. Nevertheless, on-farm losses in storage in developing countries, particularly in African countries, can be high although the exact nature of such losses is much debated.

In the food industry of the United States, the food supply of which is the most diverse and abundant of any country in the world, loss occurs from the beginning of food production chain. From planting, crops can be subjected to pest infestations and severe weather, which cause losses before harvest. Since natural forces (e.g. temperature and precipitation) remain the primary drivers of crop growth, losses from these can be experienced by all forms of outdoor agriculture. On average, farms in the United States lose up to six billion pounds of crops every year because of these unpredictable conditions. According to the IPCC sixth assessment report, encouraging the development of technologies that address issues in food harvesting and post-harvesting could have a significant impact on decreasing food waste in the supply chain early-on.

The use of machinery in harvesting can cause loss, as harvesters may be unable to discern between ripe and immature crops, or collect only part of a crop. Economic factors, such as regulations and standards for quality and appearance, also cause food waste; farmers often harvest selectively, preferring to leave crops not to standard in the field (where they can be used as fertilizer or animal feed), since they would otherwise be discarded later. This method of removing undesirable produce from harvest collection, distribution sites and grocery stores is called culling. However, usually when culling occurs at the production, food processing, retail and consumption stages, it is to remove or dispose of produce with a strange or imperfect appearance rather than produce that is spoiled or unsafe to eat. In urban areas, fruit and nut trees often go unharvested because people either do not realize that the fruit is edible or they fear that it is contaminated, despite research which shows that urban fruit is safe to consume.

Food processing
Food loss continues in the post-harvest stage, but the amounts of post-harvest loss involved are relatively unknown and difficult to estimate. Regardless, the variety of factors that contribute to food loss, both biological/environmental and socio-economical, would limit the usefulness and reliability of general figures. In storage, considerable quantitative losses can be attributed to pests and micro-organisms. This is a particular problem for countries that experience a combination of heat (around 30 °C) and ambient humidity (between 70 and 90 per cent), as such conditions encourage the reproduction of insect pests and micro-organisms. Losses in the nutritional value, caloric value and edibility of crops, by extremes of temperature, humidity or the action of micro-organisms, also account for food waste.  Further losses are generated in the handling of food and by shrinkage in weight or volume.

Some of the food loss produced by processing can be difficult to reduce without affecting the quality of the finished product. Food safety regulations are able to claim foods that contradict standards before they reach markets. Although this can conflict with efforts to reuse food loss (such as in animal feed), safety regulations are in place to ensure the health of the consumer; they are vitally important, especially in the processing of foodstuffs of animal origin (e.g. meat and dairy products), as contaminated products from these sources can lead to and are associated with microbiological and chemical hazards.

Retail

Packaging protects food from damage during its transportation from farms and factories via warehouses to retailing, as well as preserving its freshness upon arrival. Although it avoids considerable food waste, packaging can compromise efforts to reduce food waste in other ways, such as by contaminating waste that could be used for animal feedstocks with plastics.

In 2013, the nonprofit Natural Resources Defense Council (NRDC) performed research that suggests that the leading cause of food waste in America is due to uncertainty over food expiration dates, such as confusion in deciphering best-before, sell-by, or use-by dates. Joined by Harvard's Food Law and Policy Clinic, the NRDC produced a study called The Dating Game: How Confusing Food Date Labels Leads to Food Waste in America. This United States-based study looked at the intertwining laws which lead labeling to end up unclear and erratic. This uncertainty leads to consumers to toss food, most often because they think the food may be unsafe or misunderstand the labeling on the food completely. Lack of regulation on labeling can result in large quantities of food being removed from the market overall.

Retail stores throw away large quantities of food. Usually, this consists of items that have reached either their best-before, sell-by, or use-by dates. Food that has passed the best -before, and sell-by date, and even some food that passed the use-by date is still edible at the time of disposal, but stores have widely varying policies to handle the excess food. Some stores put effort into preventing access to poor or homeless people, while others work with charitable organization to distribute food. Retailers also contribute to waste as a result of their contractual arrangements with suppliers. Failure to supply agreed quantities renders farmers or processors liable to have their contracts cancelled. As a consequence, they plan to produce more than actually required to meet the contract, to have a margin of error. Surplus production is often simply disposed of.

Retailers usually have strict cosmetic standards for produce, and if fruits or vegetables are misshapen or superficially bruised, they are often not put on the shelf. In the United States, some of the estimated six billion pounds of produce wasted each year are discarded because of appearance.  The USDA publishes guidelines used as a baseline assessment by produce distributors, grocery stores, restaurants and other consumers in order to rate the quality of food. These guidelines and how they rate are readily available on their website. For example, apples get graded by their size, color, wax residue, firmness, and skin appearance. If apples rank highly in these categories and show close to no superficial defects, they are rated as "U.S. Extra Fancy" or "U.S. Fancy", these are the typical ratings sought out by grocery stores when purchasing their produce.  Any apples with suboptimal levels of appearance are ranked as either "U.S. Number 1" or "Utility" and are not normally purchased for retail, as recommended by produce marketing sources, despite being safe and edible. A number of regional programs and organizations have been established by the EPA and USDA in an attempt to reduce such produce waste. Organizations in other countries, such as Good & Fugly in Australia and No Food Waste in India, are making similar efforts worldwide. The popular trend of selling "imperfect" produce at retail has been criticized for overlooking existing markets for these foods (eg the food processing industry and bargain grocery stores) and downplaying the household-level wasting of food that is statistically a larger part of the overall problem.

The fishing industry wastes substantial amounts of food: about 40–60% of fish caught in Europe is discarded as the wrong size or wrong species.

This comes to about 2.3 million tonnes per annum in the North Atlantic and the North Sea.

Food-Service Industry 

To address food waste, it is understood that there are multiple stakeholders throughout the food supply chain. The food supply chain is a market-driven system that requires a specific focus on each stakeholder in the food-making process and their food waste quantification can be dependent on geographical scales. This geographical scale then results in the production of different definitions of food waste, as mentioned earlier, with respect to the complexities of food supply chains (FSCs) and then create a narrative that further shows the needs for specific research on important stakeholders. The food service industry suggests to be a key stakeholder to achieve mitigation.  The key players within the food service industry include the manufacturers, producers, farmers, managers, employees, and consumers. The key causes of food waste in restaurants include the food menu, the production procedure, the use of pre-prepared versus whole food products, dinnerware size, type of ingredients used, the dishes served, opening hours, and disposal methods. These factors then can be categorized in the different stages of operations that relate to pre-kitchen, kitchen-based, and post-kitchen processes. In restaurants in developing countries, the lack of infrastructure and associated technical and managerial skills in food production have been identified as the key drivers in the creation of food waste currently and in the future. Comparatively, developed countries show that the majority of food waste is produced post-consumer, which is driven by the low prices of food and disposable income, consumers high expectations of food cosmetic standards, and the increasing disconnect between consumers and how food is being produced (Urbanization). That being said, in United States restaurants alone, an estimated 22 to 33 billion pounds are wasted each year.

Consumption
Consumers are directly and indirectly responsible for wasting a lot of food, which could for a large part be avoided if they were willing to accept suboptimal food (SOF) that deviates in sensory characteristics (odd shapes, discolorations) or has a best-before date that is approaching or has passed, but is still perfectly fine to eat. In addition to inedible and edible food waste generated by consumers, substantial amounts of food is wasted through food overconsumption, also referred to as metabolic food waste, estimated globally as 10% of foods reaching the consumer.

By sector

Fruit and vegetables

Grains

Extent

Global extent
Efforts are underway by the Food and Agriculture Organization (FAO) and the United Nations Environment Programme (UNEP) to measure progress towards SDG Target 12.3 through two separate indices: the Food Loss Index (FLI) and the Food Waste Index (FWI).

According to FAO's The State of Food and Agriculture 2019, globally, in 2016, around 14 percent of the world's food is lost from production before reaching the retail level. Generally, levels of loss are higher for fruits and vegetables than for cereals and pulses. However, even for the latter, significant levels are found in sub-Saharan Africa and Eastern and South-Eastern Asia, while they are limited in Central and Southern Asia.

Estimates from UN Environment's Food Waste Index suggest that about 931 million tonnes of food, or 17 percent of total food available to consumers in 2019, went into the waste bins of households, retailers, restaurants and other food services.

According to a report from Feedback EU, the EU wastes 153 million tonnes of food each year, around double previous estimates.

Earlier estimates 
As the following table shows, industrialized and developing countries differ substantially. In developing countries, it is estimated that 400–500 calories per day per person are wasted, while in developed countries 1,500 calories per day per person are wasted. In the former, more than 40% of losses occur at the post-harvest and processing stages, while in the latter, more than 40% of losses occur at the retail and consumer levels. The total food waste by consumers in industrialized countries is almost equal to the entire food production in sub-Saharan Africa.

A 2013 report from the British Institution of Mechanical Engineers (IME) likewise estimated that 30–50% (or  ) of all food produced remains uneaten.

Individual countries

Australia
Each year in New South Wales, more than 25 million meals are delivered by charity OzHarvest from food that would otherwise be wasted. Each year, the Australian economy loses $20 billion in food waste. This has a crucial environmental impact through the waste of resources used to produce, manufacture, package, and distribute that food.

In addition, it is estimated that 7.6 million tonnes of CO2 is generated by the disposed food in landfills. It is also the cause of odour, leaching, and potential generation for diseases. In March 2019, the Australian ministry of the environment shared the key findings of Australia's National food waste baseline, which will facilitate the tracking of the progress towards their goal to halve Australian food waste by 2030.

Many initiatives were taken by the Australian government in order to help achieve this goal. In fact, they financed $1.2 million in organization that invest in renewable energies systems to store and transport food. They also funded more than $10 million for research on food waste reduction. Local governments have also implemented programs such as information sessions on storing food and composting, diversion of waste from restaurants and cafes from landfills to shared recycling facilities and donation of food to organization that would otherwise be wasted.

Canada 
In Canada, 58% of all food is wasted, amounting to 35.5 million tonnes of food per annuum. The value of this lost food is equivalent to CA$21 billion. Such quantities of food would be enough to feed all Canadians for five months. It is estimated that about one third of this waste could be spared and sent to those in need. There are many factors that contribute to such large-scale waste. Manufacturing and processing food alone incur costs of CA$21 billion, or 4.82 million tons. Per household, it is estimated that $1,766 is lost in food loss and waste. The Government of Canada identifies three main factors contributing to household waste: (1) buying too much food and not eating it before it spoils, (2) malfunctioning or poorly-designed packaging that does not deter spoilage rates or contamination, and (3) improper disposing of food – using garbage bins instead of those intended for organic waste.

Canada, Mexico, and the United States are working together under the Commission for Environmental Cooperation in order to address the severe problem of food waste in North America.

Canada specifically is working in the following ways to reduce food waste:

 Canada pledged to consult on strategies in the Strategy on Short-lived Climate Pollutants to reduce avoidable food waste within the country. This will help to reduce methane emissions from Canadian landfills.
 The government has implemented a Food Policy for Canada, which is a movement towards a more sustainable food system.
 In February 2019, the government brought together several experts from different sectors to share ideas and discuss opportunities for measuring and reducing food loss and waste across the food supply chain.

China
In 2015 the Chinese Academy of Sciences reported that in big cities there was 17 to 18 million tons of food waste, enough to feed over 30 million people. About 25% of the waste was staple foods and about 18% meat.

In August 2020 the Chinese Communist Party general secretary Xi Jinping said the amount of food waste was shocking and distressing. A local authority campaign "Operation empty plate" was started to reduce waste, including encouraging food outlets to limit orders to one fewer main dish than the number of customers.

As of December 2020, a draft law is under consideration to penalise food outlets if they encourage or mislead customers to order excessive meals causing obvious waste, first with a warning and then fines of up to 10,000 yuan. It would allow restaurants to charge customers who leave excessive leftovers. Broadcasters who promote overeating or food waste could also be fined up to 100,000 yuan.

Denmark
According to Ministry of Environment (Denmark), over 700,000 tonnes per year of food is wasted every year in Denmark in the entire food value chain from farm to fork. Due to the work of activist Selina Juul's Stop Wasting Food movement, Denmark has achieved a national reduction in food waste by 25% in 5 years (2010–2015).

France 

In France, approximately 1.3–1.9 million tonnes of food waste is produced every year, or between 20 and 30 kilograms per person per year. Out of the 10 million tonnes of food that is either lost or wasted in the country, 7.1 million tonnes of food wasted in the country, only 11% comes from supermarkets. Not only does this cost the French €16 billion per year, but also the negative impact on the environment is also shocking. In France, food waste emits 15.3 million tonnes of CO2, which represents 3% of the country's total CO2 emission. In response to this issue, in 2016, France became the first country in the world to pass a unanimous legislation that bans supermarkets from throwing away or destroying unsold food. Instead, supermarkets are expected to donate such food to charities and food banks. In addition to donating food, many businesses claim to prevent food waste by selling soon-to-be wasted products at discounted prices. The National Pact Against Food Waste in France has outlined eleven measures to achieve a food waste reduction by half by 2025.

Hungary 
According to the research of National Food Chain Safety Office in 2019 based on the official EU methodological framework, an average Hungarian consumer generates 68 kg food waste annually. 49% of this amount would be avoidable.
The research team (Wasteless project) replicated the study in 2019 involving 165 households. According to the data, food waste generated by the Hungarian households was estimated to be 65.5 kg per capita annually. Between the two periods, a 4% decrease was observed, despite significant economic expansion.

Italy 
According to REDUCE project, which produced the first baseline dataset for Italy based on official EU methodological framework, food waste is 530 g per person per week at household stage (only edible fraction); food waste in school canteens corresponds to 586 g per pupil per week; retail food waste per capita, per year corresponds to 2.9 kg. See https://www.sprecozero.it/wp-content/uploads/2019/07/REDUCE-FINAL_SDG-12.3-ITALY_FOOD-WASTE-1.pdf

Netherlands 
According to Meeusen & Hagelaar (2008), between 30% and 50% of all food produced was estimated to be lost or thrown away at that time in the Netherlands, while a 2010 Agriculture Ministry (LNV) report stated that the Dutch population wasted 'at least 9.5m tonnes of food per year, worth at least €4.4bn.' In 2019, three studies into food waste in households in the Netherlands commissioned by the LNV were conducted, showing that the average household waste per capita had been reduced from 48 kilograms of "solid food (including dairy products, fats, sauces and soups)" in 2010, to 41.2 kilograms in 2016, to 34.3 kilograms in 2019. The waste of liquid foods (excluding beer and wine, first measured in 2019) that ended up in the sewer through sinks or toilets was analysed to have decreased from 57.3 litres per capita in 2010 to 45.5 litres in 2019.

New Zealand
Research done on household food waste in New Zealand found that larger households and households with more young people created more food waste. The average household in this case study put 40% of food waste into the rubbish.

Singapore
In Singapore,  of food was wasted in 2014. Of that,  were recycled.  Since Singapore has limited agriculture ability, the country spent about S$14.8 billion (US$10.6 billion) on importing food in 2014. US$1.4 billion of it ends up being wasted, or 13 percent.

On January 1, 2020, Singapore implemented the Zero Waste Masterplan which aims to reduce Singapore's daily waste production by 30 percent. The project also aims to extend the lifespan of the Semaku Landfill, Singapore's only landfill, beyond 2025. As a direct result of the project, food waste dropped to 665,000 tonnes, showing a significant decrease from 2017's all-time high of 810,000 tonnes.

United Kingdom

This represents costs of £250 to £400 a year per household.

United States
Estimates of food waste in the United States range from 35 million tons to 103 million tons. In a study done by National Geographic in 2014, Elizabeth Royte indicated more than 30 percent of food in the United States, valued at $162 billion annually, isn't eaten. The University of Arizona conducted a study in 2004, which indicated that 14 to 15% of United States edible food is untouched or unopened, amounting to $43 billion worth of discarded, but edible, food. In 2010, the United States Department of Agriculture has come forth with estimations from the Economic Research Service that approximates food waste in the United States to be equivalent to 141 trillion calories.

USDA data from 2010 shows that 26% of fish, meat, poultry were thrown away at the retail and consumer level. Since then meat production has increased by more than 10%. Data scientist Harish Sethu says this means that billions of animals are raised and slaughtered only to end up in a landfill.

Impact on the environment

Empirical evidence at the global level on the environmental footprints for major commodity groups suggests that, if the aim is to reduce land use, the primary focus should be on meat and animal products, which account for 60 percent of the land footprint associated with food loss and waste. If the aim is to target water scarcity, cereals and pulses make the largest contribution (more than 70 percent), followed by fruits and vegetables. In terms of greenhouse gas (GHG) emissions associated with food loss and waste, the biggest contribution is again from cereals and pulses (more than 60 percent), followed by roots, tubers and oil-bearing crops. However, the environmental footprint for different commodities also varies across regions and countries, due, among other things, to differences in crop yields and production techniques. According to the IPCC 6th Assessment Report, the reduction of food waste would be beneficial for improving availability of resources such as "water, land-use, energy consumption" and the overall reduction of greenhouse gas emissions into the atmosphere.

Prevention and valorisation 

In 2022 United Nations Biodiversity Conference nations adopted an agreement for preserving biodiversity, including a commitment to reduce food waste by 50% by the year 2030.

According to FAO's The State of Food and Agriculture 2019, the case for reducing food loss and waste includes gains that society can reap but which individual actors may not take into account, namely: (i) increased productivity and economic growth; (ii) improved food security and nutrition; and (iii) mitigation of environmental impacts of losing and wasting food, in particular terms of reducing greenhouse gas (GHG emissions as well as lowering pressure on land and water resources. The last two societal gains, in particular, are typically seen as externalities of reducing food loss and waste.

Response to the problem of food waste at all social levels has varied hugely, including campaigns from advisory and environmental groups, and concentrated media attention on the subject.

As suggested by the food waste hierarchy, prevention and reuse pathways for human consumption have the highest priority levels for food waste treatment. The general approach to food waste reduction comprise two main pathways: prevention and valorisation. Prevention of food waste infers all actions that reduce food production and ultimately prevent food from being produced in vain, such as food donations or re-processing into new food products. Valorisation on the other hand comprise actions that recover the materials, nutrients or energy in food waste, for instance by producing animal feed, fuel or energy.

Multiple studies have studied the environmental benefits of food waste prevention measures, including food donations, recovery of unharvested vegetables for re-use in food production, re-processing of surplus bread for beer production, and producing chutney or juice from leftovers. Food waste can also be used to produce multiple high-value products, such as a fish oil substitute for food or feed use via marine micro algae, without compromising the ability to produce energy via biogas. The general consensus currently suggest that reducing food waste by either prevention or valorisation, for human consumption, infers higher environmental benefits compared to the lower priority levels, such as energy production or disposal.

Multiple private enterprises have developed hardware and software solutions dealing mainly with the prevention of food waste within foodservice production facilities (contract catering, hotels & resorts, cruise ships, casinos etc.), by gathering quantitative and qualitative data about the specific food waste, helping chefs and managers reduce food waste by up to 70% by improving and optimising their workflows and menus.

Food rescue 

There are multiple initiatives that rescue food that would otherwise not be consumed by humans anymore. The food can come from supermarkets, restaurants or private households for example. Such initiatives are:
 food banks,
 online platforms like Too Good To Go and Olio,
 public foodsharing shelves like those from foodsharing.de and
 dumpster diving.

Consumer marketing 
One way of dealing with food waste is to reduce its creation. Consumers can reduce spoilage by planning their food shopping, avoiding potentially wasteful spontaneous purchases, and storing foods properly (and also preventing a too large buildup of perishable stock).  Widespread educational campaigns have been shown to be an effective way to reduce food waste.

A British campaign called "Love Food, Hate Waste" has raised awareness about preventative measures to address food waste for consumers. Through advertisements, information on food storage and preparation and in-store education, the UK observed a 21% decrease in avoidable household food waste over the course of 5 years.

Another potential solution is for "smart packaging" which would indicate when food is spoiled more precisely than expiration dates currently do, for example with temperature-sensitive ink, plastic that changes color when exposed to oxygen, or gels that change color with time.

An initiative in Curitiba, Brazil called Cambio Verde allows farmers to provide surplus produce (produce they would otherwise discard due to too low prices) to people that bring glass and metal to recycling facilities (to encourage further waste reduction). In Europe, the Food Surplus Entrepreneurs Network (FSE Network), coordinates a network of social businesses and nonprofit initiatives with the goal to spread best practices to increase the use of surplus food and reduction of food waste.

An overarching consensus exists on the substantial environmental benefits of food waste reduction. On the other hand, one study looking at food waste reduction measures in the United Kingdom found that rebound effect may cause substitutive consumption as a result of economic savings made from food waste prevention. They estimated that a reduction of one tonne of food waste could lead to substantial reductions in GHG emissions, in the order of 706–896 kg CO2-eq. Rebound effect may however reduce such GHG savings by up to 60%.

Collection

In areas where the waste collection is a public function, food waste is usually managed by the same governmental organization as other waste collection. Most food waste is combined with general waste at the source. Separate collections, also known as source-separated organics, have the advantage that food waste can be disposed of in ways not applicable to other wastes. In the United States, companies find higher and better uses for large commercial generators of food and beverage waste.

From the end of the 19th century through the middle of the 20th century, many municipalities collected food waste (called "garbage" as opposed to "trash") separately. This was typically disinfected by steaming and fed to pigs, either on private farms or in municipal piggeries.

Separate curbside collection of food waste is now being revived in some areas. To keep collection costs down and raise the rate of food waste segregation, some local authorities, especially in Europe, have introduced "alternate weekly collections" of biodegradable waste (including, e.g., garden waste), which enable a wider range of recyclable materials to be collected at reasonable cost, and improve their collection rates. However, they result in a two-week wait before the waste will be collected. The criticism is that particularly during hot weather, food waste rots and stinks, and attracts vermin. Waste container design is therefore essential to making such operations feasible. Curbside collection of food waste is also done in the U.S., some ways by combining food scraps and yard waste together. Several states in the U.S. have introduced a yard waste ban, not accepting leaves, brush, trimmings, etc. in landfills. Collection of food scraps and yard waste combined is then recycled and composted for reuse.

Disposal
As alternatives to landfill, food waste can be composted to produce soil and fertilizer, fed to animals or insects, or used to produce energy or fuel. Some wasted fruit parts, can also be biorefined to extract useful substances for the industry (i.e. succinic acid from orange peels, lycopene from tomato peels).

Landfills and greenhouse gases

Dumping food waste in a landfill causes odour as it decomposes, attracts flies and vermin, and has the potential to add biological oxygen demand (BOD) to the leachate. The European Union Landfill Directive and Waste Regulations, like regulations in other countries, enjoin diverting organic wastes away from landfill disposal for these reasons. Starting in 2015, organic waste from New York City restaurants will be banned from landfills.

In countries such as the United States and the United Kingdom, food scraps constitute around 19% of the waste buried in landfills, where it biodegrades very easily and produces methane, a powerful greenhouse gas.

Methane, or CH4, is the second most prevalent greenhouse gas that is released into the air, also produced by landfills in the U.S. Although methane spends less time in the atmosphere (12 years) than CO2, it's more efficient at trapping radiation. It is 25 times greater to impact climate change than CO2 in a 100-year period. Humans accounts over 60% of methane emissions globally.

Fodder and insect feed
Large quantities of fish, meat, dairy and grain are discarded at a global scale annually, when they can be used for things other than human consumption. The feeding of food scraps or slop to domesticated animals such as pigs or chickens is, historically, the most common way of dealing with household food waste. The animals turn roughly two thirds of their ingested food into gas or fecal waste, while the last third is digested and repurposed as meat or dairy products. There are also different ways of growing produce and feeding livestock that could ultimately reduce waste.

Bread and other cereal products discarded from the human food chain could be used to feed chickens. Chickens have traditionally been given mixtures of waste grains and milling by-products in a mixture called chicken scratch. As well, giving table scraps to backyard chickens is a large part of that movement's claim to sustainability, though not all backyard chicken growers recommend it. Ruminants and pigs have also been fed bakery waste for a long time.

Certain food waste (such as flesh) can also be used as feed in maggot farming. The maggots can then be fed to other animals. In China, some food waste is being processed by feeding it to cockroaches.

Composting

Food waste can be biodegraded by composting, and reused to fertilize soil. Composting is the aerobic process completed by microorganisms in which the bacteria break down the food waste into simpler organic materials that can then be used in soil. By redistributing nutrients and high microbial populations, compost reduces water runoff and soil erosion by enhancing rainfall penetration, which has been shown to reduce the loss of sediment, nutrients, and pesticide losses to streams by 75–95%.

Composting food waste leads to a decrease in the quantity of greenhouse gases released into the atmosphere. In landfills, organic food waste decomposes anaerobically, producing methane gas that is emitted into the atmosphere. When this biodegradable waste is composted, it decomposes aerobically and does not produce methane, but instead produces organic compost that can then be utilized in agriculture. Recently, the city of New York has begun to require that restaurants and food-producing companies begin to compost their leftover food. Another instance of composting progress is a Wisconsin-based company called WasteCap, who is dedicated towards aiding local communities create composting plans.

Municipal Food Waste (MFW) can be composted to create this product of organic fertilizer, and many municipalities choose to do this citing environmental protection and economic efficiency as reasoning.  Transporting and dumping waste in landfills requires both money and room in the landfills that have very limited available space. One municipality who chose to regulate MFW is San Francisco, who requires citizens to separate compost from trash on their own, instituting fines for non-compliance at $100 for individual homes and $500 for businesses. The city's economic reasoning for this controversial mandate is supported by their estimate that one business can save up to $30000 annually on garbage disposal costs with the implementation of the required composting.

Home composting 
Composting is an economical and environmentally conscious step many homeowners could take to reduce their impact on landfill waste. Instead of food scraps and spoiled food taking up space in trashcans or stinking up the kitchen before the bag is full, it could be put outside and broken down by worms and added to garden beds.

Anaerobic digestion

Anaerobic digestion produces both useful gaseous products and a solid fibrous "compostable" material. Anaerobic digestion plants can provide energy from waste by burning the methane created from food and other organic wastes to generate electricity, defraying the plants' costs and reducing greenhouse gas emissions. The United States Environmental Protection Agency states that the use of anaerobic composting allows for large amounts of food waste to avoid the landfills. Instead of producing these greenhouse gasses into the environment from being in a landfill, the gasses can alternatively be harnessed in these facilities for reuse.

Since this process of composting produces high volumes of biogas, there are potential safety issues such as explosion and poisoning. These interactions require proper maintenance and personal protective equipment is utilized. Certain U.S. states, such as Oregon, have implemented the requirement for permits on such facilities, based on the potential danger to the population and surrounding environment.

Food waste coming through the sanitary sewers from garbage disposal units is treated along with other sewage and contributes to sludge.

Commercial liquid food waste

Commercially, food waste in the form of wastewater coming from commercial kitchens' sinks, dishwashers and floor drains is collected in holding tanks called grease interceptors to minimize flow to the sewer system. This often foul-smelling waste contains both organic and inorganic waste (chemical cleaners, etc.) and may also contain hazardous hydrogen sulfide gases. It is referred to as fats, oils, and grease (FOG) waste or more commonly "brown grease" (versus "yellow grease", which is fryer oil that is easily collected and processed into biodiesel) and is an overwhelming problem, especially in the US, for the aging sewer systems. Per the US EPA, sanitary sewer overflows also occur due to the improper discharge of FOGs to the collection system. Overflows discharge  of untreated wastewater annually into local waterways, and up to 3,700 illnesses annually are due to exposure to contamination from sanitary sewer overflows into recreational waters.

See also

Gleaning
Anaerobic digestion
Waste & Resources Action Programme
List of waste types
Post-harvest losses (grains)
Post-harvest losses (vegetables)
Source Separated Organics
Waste management

Sources

References

Further reading

External links

 NRDC page on food waste (advocacy site with suggestions)
Reduced Food Waste - Solution Summary Project Drawdown, 2020.
 Food Waste and Rescue Report in Israel
low down food waste
Wasting Nothing, Project Regeneration, 2021.

 
Waste
Waste